Emilie Løvberg (born 4 July 1995) is a Norwegian swimmer. She competed in the women's 50 metre butterfly event at the 2018 FINA World Swimming Championships (25 m), in Hangzhou, China.

References

External links
 

1995 births
Living people
Norwegian female butterfly swimmers
Place of birth missing (living people)